Norfork Dam is a large dam in northern Arkansas southeast of Mountain Home. It dams North Fork River and creates Norfork Lake. The top of the dam supports a 2-lane roadway, part of AR 177.

History

In the late 1930s, before construction of the Norfork Dam had begun, the local economy of Baxter County, Arkansas was deteriorating.  The yearly per capita income had fallen to between one-hundred and two-hundred dollars, and in 1940 alone more than six hundred small farms were abandoned.  Those who remained looked forward with enthusiasm to any solution that promised relief from their economic problems.  Mountain Home, Arkansas, then the largest community, was described as having no prospect for new business and very few paved roads.  When construction of the dam finally began in the spring of 1941 it was said that, "before the first shovel of dirt was thrown, or the first tree dozed down, the Mountain Home people knew that a new era had dawned" United States, History of the Corps of Engineers.  As the largest nearby community, Mountain Home was to derive the most spectacular benefit for the Corps projects in the area.  Centrally located between both Norfork and Bull Shoals Dam, few of its citizens could foresee the economic change Norfork Dam would bring to the poor agricultural community (Messick).

Clyde T. Ellis, who defeated Claude Fuller in 1938 to become the representative for the third district, envisioned a smaller Arkansas version of the Tennessee Valley Authority.  Ellis made Norfork Dam his personal project and fought for it until construction began in the spring of 1941.  Having won the election with the promise of cheap hydroelectricity, he hoped the dams would give rise to industry and lift the region out of the depths of depression.  Ellis firmly believed that if Norfork Dam was built then the other dams would follow.  Authorization for construction of the dam was included as part of the Flood Control Act of 1938.  Norfork Dam was to be one of six dams built to accomplish flood control in the White River basin.  The act was later revised in 1941 to include Bull Shoals and Table Rock.

Power generation
Power generation was not originally included in the project purpose for Norfork Dam.  However, this was unacceptable to the people of Baxter County and the surrounding region.  The sparse population of the area did not justify investment, by private companies, in a large network of power lines.  It was believed that, if the dam did not include power generation, it could be many years before the region would gain service.  While most citizens would have accepted any type of government project to help boost the economy, a large delegation from the region met in Harrison, Arkansas to insist that power generation be included in the project purpose.  The Baxter County delegation wanted to pass a resolution that would have expressed opposition to any dam that did not include hydroelectric power facilities.  They feared that the cost/benefit ratio would not justify congressional expenditure unless power generation was included, and the dam would never be built.  However, the Batesville, Arkansas delegation was able to convince the assembly that the resolution may be interpreted as general opposition to the dam and it never passed.  They believed that the population and economic growth brought by the construction of the dam would make it feasible for power companies to move in.  As it happened the citizens of Baxter County need not have worried.  Shortly after construction began Congress, under the threat of impending war, authorized construction of the power house and two out of the four generators for Norfork Dam (Messick).

Construction
Built on the North Fork River, Norfork Dam was one of the six largest concrete dams in the country at the time of its construction.  All preliminary investigation, the final design of the structure, and the preparation of construction plans and specs was carried out under the supervision of Lieutenant Colonel Stanley L. Scott.  Much work had to be done before construction could begin on the massive structure.  First, a suitable location had to be found before any other type of work could begin.  Because of the large number of caves in the region foundation exploration, using diamond tipped drills, was carried out for nearly a year before plans were completed.  Once a site was selected, a nearby source of sufficient materials for construction had to be located.  Since the site was acceptable for either an earth or concrete dam, the types of construction materials and their locations would be the deciding factor in determining what type of dam would be built.  The decision to build a concrete dam was made because sufficient quantities of concrete aggregate could be located near the construction site, while there was insufficient material for an earth dam.  The detailed design of the dam, construction plans and specifications were prepared by the design section of the engineering division under Mr. G.R. Schneider.

The construction contracts for the dam were awarded to the Morrison-Knudsen company and the Utah Construction Company. Both companies had participated in the construction of the Grand Coulee Dam and Hoover Dam. This was accomplished using draglines and power shovels. Most of the smaller aggregate used in construction was removed from the sand and gravel bars of a twenty-mile (32 km) section of the White River. A quarry and crushing plant was required to create nearly 800,000 tons of larger aggregate. Between thirty-five hundred and four thousand people came to witness the first blast to be made on Norfork Dam. Touted by advertisers as the biggest blast in the world; many of the spectators were sorely disappointed when the blast finally occurred. They had been made to believe that the entire cliff was going to be blown away. After the event, construction officials said no one had ever intended to do this and apologized for the disappointment (Blevins; Scott).

Norfork Dam is a gravity dam; this means that it resists the thrust of water entirely by its own weight.  This takes enormous amounts of concrete which can be expensive; however, many engineers prefer the solid strength of gravity dams to arch dams or buttress dams.  For example, Norfork Dam and the powerhouse cost approximately 28,600,000 dollars; a very large sum of money in the early 1940s.  It was constructed in sections, called monoliths, ranging from forty to fifty-four feet in length and not exceeding five feet in height (Scott).

The completion of the dam had an immediate effect; with freedom from the fear of floods many people began to reoccupy farms downstream of the dam.  Ironically the areas most affected by seasonal flooding were those covered by the reservoir, and the dam had little effect on flooding of the White River.  However, not everyone was happy with the construction of the dam, nearly four-hundred people had to be removed from one of the most heavily populated and prosperous regions of Baxter County to make room for the reservoir.  The government only paid people for their land if they had structures on it, effectively stealing thousands of acres from rightful landowners.  As a result, many people did not get paid for their land when it was covered. One Widowed woman was given only $1500 in exchange for 666 acres in the present day Cranfield Area of the lake. This was awarded after a nearly 10 year long legal battle. One man who thought he had lake front property paid taxes on it until 2004 when he realized that his property was underwater (Andrewson).

The record level of 581.84 feet occurred in 2008, according to the U.S. Corps Of Engineers. Flood pool is 580 feet.

Effect of Norfork Dam on Baxter County
From the very beginning Norfork Dam has brought tourists to Baxter County and the surrounding area, and with them an economic prosperity that no one could have dreamed of at the time.

Norfork Lake 

There are 19 recreational parks on the lake that provide places for camping, hiking, picnicking, swimming, boating, and water skiing. Commercial docks on Norfork Lake provide boats, motors, diving equipment, and guides to the lake.

Most of the lake lies within Baxter County, Arkansas, with its Northernmost portion in Ozark County, Missouri.

Bass, crappie, walleye, catfish, and bream are all found on the lake with almost all other varieties of fresh water game fish. Below the dam, North Fork River has a superb population of trout. The Norfork National Fish Hatchery maintains a continuous supply of trout.

See also 
 List of Arkansas dams and reservoirs

Notes

References
 Andrewson, Jane. Personal interview. 12 Apr. 2005.
 Blevins, Bill D. Baxter County Chronicles. Mountain
 Home: Tumbling Shoals Publishing Company, 2005.
 Messick, Mary A. History of Baxter County 1873-1973.
 Mountain Home: Mountain Home Chamber of Commerce, 1973.
 Scott, Stanley L. "Norfork Dam Magazine." Norfork
 Dam Magazine. Mountain Home: Shiras Brothers
 Print Shop, 1941.
 United States. United States Army Corps of Engineers.
 A History of The Little Rock District U.S. Army
 Corps of Engineers 1881-1979. Little Rock: U.S.
 Army Corps of Engineers, 1979.
 Norfork Lake. Little Rock: U.S. Corps of Engineers, 2005.

External links

Norfork Lake Chamber of Commerce

Buildings and structures in Baxter County, Arkansas
Dams in Arkansas
Reservoirs in Arkansas
Lakes of the U.S. Interior Highlands
Ozarks
Reservoirs in Missouri
United States Army Corps of Engineers dams
Bodies of water of Baxter County, Arkansas
Bodies of water of Ozark County, Missouri
1940s establishments in Arkansas